Fasih (  is an Arabic male name meaning eloquent, literary. In Persian it means wide, ample, vast.

Given name
Admiral Fasih Bokhari, Retired four-star admiral, Chief of Naval Staff (Pakistan) and ex-Chairman of the National Accountability Bureau
Fasih Bari Khan, Pakistani television scriptwriter
Syed Fasihuddin Soharwardy (1956), Pakistani Urdu nasheed singer or Naat Khawan
Syed Fasihuddin (1938), Former cricketer

References

Arabic masculine given names
Arabic-language surnames
Urdu masculine given names